Karl-Axel Kennert "Kenneth" Ekman (born 5 May 1945) is a Swedish former professional ice hockey defenceman. He competed as a member of the Sweden men's national ice hockey team at the 1972 Winter Olympics held in Japan.

He is grandfather of the hockey player Oliver Ekman-Larsson and the football player Amanda Ilestedt and a cousin of Fåglum brothers.

References

External links
 

1945 births
Living people
Ice hockey players at the 1972 Winter Olympics
Olympic ice hockey players of Sweden
Rögle BK players
Swedish ice hockey defencemen
Tingsryds AIF players